Skiles may refer to:

 People
 Scott Skiles, born 1964, an American basketball player
 Wesley C. Skiles, (1958–2010), American cave diving pioneer
 William W. Skiles, William Woodburn Skiles (1849–1904) was a U.S. Politician
 William Vernon Skiles, (1879–1947), American mathematician 
 William West Skiles
 Skiles and Henderson, US comedy duo
 Jeff Skiles

 Places
 Skiles Test Nature Park